Maddi Sudarsanam (b: 1906 - d: 1994) was an Indian Parliamentarian.

He was elected to the 4th Lok Sabha and 5th Lok Sabha from Narasaraopet (Lok Sabha constituency) in 1967 and 1971 respectively as a member of Indian National Congress.

External links
 Biodata of Maddi Sudarsanam at Lok Sabha website.
Mr Maddi sudarsanam was also a freedom fighter.

Director of RBI, SBI, Andhra Bank and first chairman of AP State  Financial corporation.

Former president of FAPCCI, Governor of Rotary District 315.

He has contributed for the establishment of many Institutions at Guntur like Hindu College, TJPS College, MBTS Polytechnic and Srikrishnasramam Harijan Industrial School.

References

Telugu politicians
1906 births
1994 deaths
India MPs 1967–1970
India MPs 1971–1977
Lok Sabha members from Andhra Pradesh
Indian National Congress politicians from Andhra Pradesh
People from Guntur